Mark Andrew Divin (born 6 February 1980) is an Australian former professional cricketer who played for Tasmania.

External links

1980 births
Australian cricketers
Living people
Cricketers from Melbourne
Tasmania cricketers
People from Footscray, Victoria